James Gordon Lind (8 March 1913 – 22 April 1980) was a Liberal party member of the House of Commons of Canada. He was born in Westminster Township, Ontario and became a lumber merchant by career.

Jim Lind was first elected at the Middlesex East riding in the 1965 general election, after a previous unsuccessful campaign in that riding in the 1963 election. He was re-elected to Parliament in the 1968 election at Middlesex riding. After completing his final term in the 28th Canadian Parliament, Lind left the House of Commons and did not seek further re-election.

References 
 

1913 births
1980 deaths
Members of the House of Commons of Canada from Ontario
Liberal Party of Canada MPs
People from Middlesex County, Ontario